The 1972 New York Giants season was the franchise's 48th season in the National Football League (NFL). The Giants had an 8–6 record and finished in third place in the National Football Conference East Division, three games behind the Washington Redskins.

The Giants had two first-round selections in the 1972 NFL Draft, and chose Eldridge Small and Larry Jacobson with the 17th and 24th overall picks, respectively. Before the season, New York traded their starting quarterback, Fran Tarkenton, to the Minnesota Vikings for a package of players and draft picks that included quarterback Norm Snead, who led the league in pass completion average in 1972. The Giants lost twice to open the season, but went on a four-game winning streak afterwards. In their 11th game, the Giants defeated the Philadelphia Eagles 62–10, setting the franchise record for the most points scored in a game; it was also an Eagles record for the most points allowed. The victory put the team at 7–4 and in contention for a playoff berth. Two losses ended their postseason chances, but New York beat the Dallas Cowboys in the final game of the season to finish with eight wins in fourteen games. Halfback Ron Johnson scored nine touchdowns on running plays to top the NFL, and his 1,182 rushing yards broke the Giants' single-season record. This was the last winning season for the Giants until 1981.

Roster

Schedule 

Note: Intra-division opponents are in bold text.

Standings

References 

1970s in the Bronx
New York Giants
New York Giants
New York Giants seasons